Western Star is an unincorporated community in Medina and Summit counties, in the U.S. state of Ohio.

History
Western Star was named for Nathan Starr, who donated land for a school in exchange for the naming rights.  A post office called Western Star was established in 1843, and remained in operation until 1910.

References

Unincorporated communities in Medina County, Ohio
Unincorporated communities in Summit County, Ohio
Unincorporated communities in Ohio